Sektensaurus (meaning "island lizard", sekten meaning "island" in Tehuelche) is a genus of ornithopod dinosaur, possibly an elasmarian, from the Late Cretaceous (Campanian) of Patagonia, Argentina. Its remains were uncovered in the fluvial tuffs of the Lago Colhué Huapí Formation in the Golfo San Jorge Basin. The type and only species is S. sanjuanboscoi.

Sektensaurus is the first non-hadrosauroid ornithopod of central Patagonia. The discovery of the genus increases the anatomical knowledge of ornithopods and adds new data on the compositions of dinosaur faunas that lived in Patagonia close to Antarctica at the end of the Cretaceous.

See also 
 South Polar region of the Cretaceous

References 

Ornithopods
Campanian life
Maastrichtian life
Late Cretaceous dinosaurs of South America
Cretaceous Argentina
Fossils of Argentina
Golfo San Jorge Basin
Fossil taxa described in 2019
Ornithischian genera